The West Lamma Channel (Chinese: 西博寮海峽) is a sea channel in Hong Kong.

See also
East Lamma Channel

References

Channels of Hong Kong
Lamma Island